Barga may refer to:

People
 Barga Mongols in the early 20th century

Places
 Barga (department), Burkina Faso
 Barga, Tuscany, Italy

Other
 Barga (kingdom), in ancient Syria
 Operation Barga